Gideon Babalola (born 11 February 1994) is a Nigerian badminton player. He was part of the national team that won the gold medal at the 2019 African Games.

Achievements

BWF International Challenge/Series (2 titles, 3 runners-up) 
Men's singles

Men's doubles

Mixed doubles

  BWF International Challenge tournament
  BWF International Series tournament
  BWF Future Series tournament

References

External links 
 

1994 births
Living people
Nigerian male badminton players
Competitors at the 2019 African Games
African Games gold medalists for Nigeria
African Games medalists in badminton
21st-century Nigerian people